Eois lunulosa is a moth in the family Geometridae. It is found in Sri Lanka and Taiwan.

Description
Its wingspan is about 22–26 mm. Antennae in both sexes bipectinate (comb like on both sides) with long branches to two-thirds of their length. Hindwings with rounded outer margin. Veins 3 and 4 stalked. Vertex of the head chestnut colored as well the frons. The shaft of the antennae are whitish. Collar crimson. Forewings with a sub-costal crimson fascia. Both wings with many of the waved lines obsolescent, and medial and postmedial lines more developed. There is an ill-defined marginal crimson band with a purplish-silvery patch at outer angle.

Subspecies
Eois lunulosa lunulosa nominate (Sri Lanka)
Eois lunulosa duplicilinea (Wileman, 1911) (Taiwan)

References

Moths described in 1887
Eois
Moths of Asia